The 1986–87 Irish League Cup (known as the Roadferry Freight League Cup for sponsorship reasons) was the first edition of Northern Ireland's secondary football knock-out cup competition. It concluded on 9 May 1987 with the final.

Linfield became the first ever winners of the competition after defeating Crusaders 2–1 in the final.

First round

|}

Second round

|}

Quarter-finals

|}

Semi-finals

|}

Final

References

Lea
1986–87 domestic association football cups
1986–87